John Donald Francis Black (December 30, 1932 – November 29, 2018) was a screenwriter, TV producer, and TV director. He is best known for his work on the TV series Star Trek: The Original Series in 1966, and its sequel series, Star Trek: The Next Generation during the 1980s.

Work
Black was the associate producer for ten episodes of Star Trek made during the program's first season, all of which were broadcast from September 8, 1966, through December 15, 1966. Black also wrote the teleplay for and was the associate producer of one of the outstanding early episodes of Star Trek—"The Naked Time". During the 1980s, Black was also given credit for the story for sequel episode, "The Naked Now", in Star Trek: The Next Generation. Black also received shared story-writing credit (with Worley Thorne, who wrote the teleplay) for one more episode in this series, "Justice", under his pseudonym of "Ralph Wills".

Black also wrote for many other TV series, including The Mary Tyler Moore Show, Charlie's Angels, Hawaii Five-O, The Fugitive, Mission: Impossible, and Mannix.

In his work for motion pictures, Black co-wrote the movie adaptation of Shaft (1971), along with co-writer Ernest Tidyman, who had written the original novel of Shaft. Black also was the screenwriter and executive producer of the detective film Trouble Man (1972), which starred Robert Hooks and whose musical score was written by Marvin Gaye.

Films

Television

Awards
In 1972, Black received an Edgar Award from the Writers Guild of America in the category of "Best Television Feature or Miniseries Teleplay" for writing the script for the made-for-TV movie Thief.

Death
According to Black's widow Mary Black, he died peacefully of natural causes at the Motion Picture Hospital in Woodland Hills, California.

References

External links

American science fiction writers
American male screenwriters
Edgar Award winners
American male novelists
1932 births
2018 deaths